Der Preis fürs Überleben is a 1980 West German drama film directed by Hans Noever. It was entered into the 30th Berlin International Film Festival.

Cast
 Michel Piccoli - René Winterhalter
 Martin West - Joseph C. Randolph
 Marilyn Clark - Betty Randolph
 Suzie Galler - Kathleen Randolph
 Daniel Rosen - Thomas Randolph
 Ben Dova - Old Jim
 Leonard Belove - Henderson
 Michael Stumm
 Roger Burget
 Al Christy
 William Kuhlke
 Henry Effertz
 Kurt Weinzierl

References

External links

1980 films
1980 drama films
German drama films
West German films
1980s German-language films
Films directed by Hans Noever
Films set in the United States
1980s German films